Ingenuin Molitor (Habach, 1610–1669) was a German-born Franciscan priest and composer. He was organist to the convent at Botzen, in the Tyrol, and published a book of sacred concertos in Innsbruck in 1668.

References

1610 births
1669 deaths
Austrian Baroque composers
17th-century classical composers
Austrian male classical composers
Austrian classical composers
People from Weilheim-Schongau
17th-century male musicians